Jane Thompson Stoddart (2 November 1863 – 15 December 1944) was a Scottish journalist and author and de facto editor of The British Weekly,  "a central force in shaping and promoting the 'Nonconformist conscience'".

Life 

Stoddart was born in Kelso in the Scottish Borders in 1863. Her parents were Margaret (born Galloway) and William Stoddart. Her father worked as an assistant to Horatius Bonar. At the age of thirteen she met Reverend William Robertson Nicoll who had just moved to Kelso from Banffshire to be the new minister. Nicoll was to become her mentor. Meanwhile, she went from school in Kelso where she learned to teach in the part of southern Edinburgh known as Bruntsfield.

1886 was her first year of having a book published. The story of A Door of Hope was described in reviews as "thoroughly healthy" and the reviewers included local papers, Home and School in Toronto and the Presbyterian Messenger said it was a "Marvellous Book". In 1877, she wrote her last work of fiction titled In Cheviots Glens. In 1881, she went to Hanover to learn more German, returning to Britain in 1883 to teach in Clifton. Using her knowledge of German she translated Still Hours in 1886 by Richard Rothe who was a Lutheran theologian who had died in 1867.

In 1890, she left her teaching job. She had been working with William Robertson Nicoll on a project, but she was now employed as his assistant.

In 1894, she published her second translation which was Ruysbroeck and the mystics, with selections from Ruysbroeck, by the Nobel Laureate Maurice Maeterlinck. She was still Nicoll's assistant as his wife died and he remarried. She would write about this in her autobiography which doesn't mention a romance with anyone. They did work together. Both Nicoll and Stoddart were opposed to the idea of referendums. In 1910, she was the prime author of a pamphlet on the subject before the election in 1910. It sold a large number of copies.

In 1923, her mentor died and she would continue to lead on his publication The British Weekly. Formally J. M. E. Ross and later John A Hutton had the job title of editor but she frequently did their job as the de facto editor.

Stoddart retired in 1937 and she published her autobiography Harvest of the Years in the following year. She died in Edinburgh in 1944.

Works include 
  A Door of Hope, 1876
In Cheviots Glens, 1877.
 (translation) Ruysbroeck and the mystics, with selections from Ruysbroeck, 1894, by Maurice Maeterlinck
 (translation) Still hours,1886), by Richard Rothe
 The girlhood of Mary queen of Scots from her landing in France in August 1548 to her departure from France in August 1561, 1908
 The life of the empress Eugenie, 1906
 The new socialism, an impartial inquiry, 1909
 Against the referendum, 1910, also by W. Robertson Nicoll
 The expositor's dictionary of texts, containing outlines, expositions and illustrations of Bible texts, with full references to the best homiletic literature, 1911, also by W. Robertson Nicoll and James Moffatt 
 The New Testament in life and literature, 1914
 The case against spiritualism, 1919
 The Christian year in human story, 1920
 My Harvest of the Years, autobiography, 1938

References 

1863 births
1944 deaths
19th-century British journalists
19th-century Scottish educators
19th-century Scottish novelists
19th-century Scottish women writers
20th-century British journalists
20th-century British non-fiction writers
20th-century British translators
20th-century Scottish women writers
20th-century Scottish writers
British women journalists
People from Kelso, Scottish Borders
Scottish autobiographers
Scottish journalists
Scottish newspaper editors
Scottish translators
Scottish women editors
Scottish women educators
Scottish women journalists